Manjar blanco, also known as manjar de leche or simply manjar, is a term used in Spanish-speaking area of the world in reference to a variety of milk-based delicacies. In Spain the term refers to blancmange, a European delicacy found in various parts of the continent as well as the United Kingdom. In the Americas (South America primarily) it refers to a sweet, white spread or pastry filling made with milk. This term is sometimes used interchangeably with dulce de leche or cajeta in Latin America but these terms generally refer to delicacies prepared differently from those just described. Related dishes exist by other names in other countries, such as tembleque in Puerto Rico. In Portuguese-speaking countries the dish is known as manjar branco.

Spain

Manjar blanco in Spain and in other parts of Europe refers to a dessert (blancmange in English), traditionally light brown in color (although often colored by added ingredients), made with a mould with a consistency like gelatin (in fact modern varieties are often made with gelatin). In the Middle Ages, the dish was prepared with chicken or fish, rice, sugar, and almond milk or milk and other ingredients (the dish was probably influenced by the Arab cuisine of Muslim Spain). Today the primary ingredients in Spain tend to be milk, almonds, corn starch or gelatin, and sugar. The variants in Spain are often somewhat different from those in France or the United Kingdom.

South America
This term is used in Peru, Ecuador, Chile, and Bolivia (not to be confused with natillas which is a similar but separate dish). It refers to a set of similar dishes traditionally made by slowly and gently cooking pure (normally non-homogenized) milk to thicken and reduce the volume, and gradually adding sugar. In some regions other ingredients such as vanilla, citrus juices, cinnamon, and even rice may also be added. Usually a double boiler of some sort is employed so as to prevent browning of the mixture (which would give it a different flavor). The result is a white or cream-colored, thick spread with a consistency much like that of a thick cake frosting although the flavor is more like that of sweetened cream (with accents of whatever additional ingredients may have been added). The cooking process is largely the same as for creating sweetened condensed milk except that the result is normally thicker.

Although manjar blanco can be used as spread much like jelly or jam is used in the U.S., it is also commonly used as a filling for pastries and cookies such as alfajores and tejas.

Central America
In Guatemala, El Salvador, and other countries in Central America manjar de leche is a pudding or custard made with milk, cornstarch (to thicken), sugar, and often other ingredients such as vanilla, cinnamon or other flavorings. This white-colored confection may be eaten by itself or used as a pastry filling. In Costa Rica, the term "natilla" refers to a cultured buttermilk-like product with a butterfat content ranging from 12% ("liviana") to 14%, sold in stores in plastic pouches. It is used as a condiment on such dishes as gallo pinto, baked potatoes, steamed vegetables and the like.

Colombia
Manjar blanco is a traditional Christmas dish in Colombia, along with natilla. It is made out of ingredients like milk, rice, and sugar, which are heated for a long period of time until the right texture is achieved. Manjar blanco is usually eaten with a slice of natilla, buñuelos, and hojuelas, creating a flavor combination from the salty buñuelos with the two sweet desserts. Manjar blanco can be found in stores during Christmas time, but is also found in stores throughout the year.

Philippines
A Filipino indigenized adaptation of this dessert is called maja blanca, and uses coconut milk instead of milk, with cornstarch or gulaman (algae-derived thickener) and sugar. It also commonly includes corn kernels, and this variation is known as maja blanca con maiz.

See also
Buñuelos
Hojuelas
List of spreads

References

External links
 Blanc-Manger: A Journey Through Time

Desserts
Almonds
Spanish cuisine
Chilean cuisine
Colombian cuisine
Mexican desserts
Puerto Rican cuisine
Peruvian cuisine
Spreads (food)
New Mexican cuisine